Pauline Henry (born 29 January 1961) is a Jamaican-British recording artist. She was the vocalist in the Scottish band the Chimes, best known for their 1990 cover version of U2's "I Still Haven't Found What I'm Looking For", between 1988 and 1991. Following her departure from the group, Henry embarked on a solo career, and achieved five UK top 40 singles between 1993 and 1996.

Early life
Henry emigrated from Jamaica to the United Kingdom when she was 10 years old, and settled in London. Before commencing her recording career, she worked as a hair stylist and make-up artist, but also did occasional work as a session singer.

Career
In early 1988, Edinburgh-based Mike Peden and James Locke were looking to form a band to record some songs they had written, but had not yet found a suitable vocalist.  Henry's name was passed on to them, and after hearing a tape of her voice played over the telephone, they arranged to meet her. Initially intending for Henry to record songs they had already written, the group soon evolved into a partnership where Henry also contributed to the songwriting. Naming themselves the Chimes, the group were signed to CBS Records after a representative from the label saw them perform live in Edinburgh.

The group's first single, "1-2-3", produced by Jazzie B and Nellee Hooper, was released in August 1989 and peaked at No. 60 in the UK. Their version of "I Still Haven't Found What I'm Looking For" found the group greater success, reaching No. 6 in the UK the following year. The Chimes' self-titled debut album was released in 1990, and reached the top 20 in the UK, Australia, Austria, and New Zealand. With subsequent singles faring less well on the charts, the band split up in 1991.

Henry then embarked on a solo career, with her first solo single, "Too Many People", reaching No. 38 in the UK in September 1993. Her next single, a cover version of Bad Company's "Feel Like Making Love", was a top 20 hit in the UK, Australia, and New Zealand. Henry's debut album, Pauline, was released in 1994, and reached the top 50 in the UK and Australia. A second solo album, Do Over, consisting of cover versions of others artists' songs, followed in 1996.

Henry then took a hiatus from her recording career, and obtained a Bachelor of Laws degree and a master's degree in Intellectual Property Law.

In 2016, Henry recorded a new version of the Chimes' song "Heaven" for the expanded re-issue of the Chimes' only album.

Discography

Albums

Studio albums

Compilations
 1998: Heaven – The Very Best of Pauline Henry & the Chimes

Singles

References

1961 births
Living people
English soul singers
Singers from London
Jamaican emigrants to the United Kingdom
20th-century Black British women singers